Sybil Smolova was a Czech-Austrian dancer and film actress of the silent era.

Selected filmography
 Werner Krafft (1916)
 Children of Darkness (1921)
 Gott, Mensch und Teufel (1924)
 Anna and Elizabeth (1933)

References

Bibliography 
 Jean Mitry. Histoire du cinéma: 1915-1925. Éditions universitaires, 1995.

External links 
 

1900 births
Year of death unknown
Austrian film actresses
Austrian silent film actresses
20th-century Austrian actresses
Czech film actresses
Czech silent film actresses
20th-century Czech actresses
Actresses from Prague